The Ranko Žeravica Sports Hall is a multi-purpose sports arena located in the Belgrade municipality of New Belgrade.

Ranko Žeravica Sports Hall, renamed in 2016 in honor of Serbian basketball coach Ranko Žeravica, is widely known by its informal title Hala. It was built in 1968 and opened in December 1968. Since 1979 it functions as part of a state-owned enterprise JP Sportski centar Novi Beograd. Nearby Sports and Recreation Center 11. April (Sportsko-rekreativni centar 11. april) is also included under its group.

Hala seats up to 5,000 people for sporting events and up to 7,000 for musical events.

In November 2010, the renovation of Hala was announced for 2011. The new-look renovated venue was presented in late of August 2011.

Sports
Hala sportova served as home floor for many Belgrade-based sports teams.

KK Partizan
The most prominent of them all was Partizan basketball club, which played its home games here from 1970 until 1990. During this time, famous Partizan players like Dragan Kićanović, Dražen Dalipagić, Vlade Divac, Aleksandar Sasha Đorđević, Predrag Danilović and Žarko Paspalj graced Hala's floor. Popular commercial radio jingle promoting Partizan at the time was: 

Their finest Hala hour occurred on 22 March 1989 in the second leg of the 1988-89 Korać Cup final. Taking on the Italian club Pallacanestro Cantù (Wiwa Vismara), Partizan came back from the first leg with a 13-point deficit. However, a heroic performance on Hala floor saw them overturn the Italians' lead and win the Cup in high style with a splendid 19-point victory 101-82 behind Divac's 30 points with Paspalj adding 22 and Đorđević 21.

Other teams
Hala has also been home to basketball's Novi Beograd, known throughout its history of sponsorships as IMT, Infos-RTM, Beopetrol, and Atlas. Another resident was Lavovi.

Other former basketball occupants included now defunct Beobanka (during the 1990s) and occasionally even nomadic BKK Radnički, which at one time or another played its home games in just about every spot within Belgrade city limits that has two hoops and a roof.

In addition to basketball, various handball, boxing, karate, aikido, and judo teams trained and hosted matches and events in Hala.

Concerts
Along with sports, Hala has played host to many shows by a variety of musical acts. They include:

See also
List of indoor arenas in Serbia

References

Indoor arenas in Serbia
Basketball venues in Serbia
Buildings and structures in Belgrade
Sports venues in Belgrade
Buildings and structures completed in 1968
KK Crvena Zvezda home arenas
KK Mega Basket home arenas
New Belgrade